Anelasma may refer to:
 Anelasma, a monotypic genus of parasitic goose barnacles
 Anelasma Miers, a genus of flowering plants, now synonymized with Abuta.